The prime symbol , double prime symbol , triple prime symbol , and quadruple prime symbol  are used to designate units and for other purposes in mathematics, science, linguistics and music.

Although the characters differ little in appearance from those of the apostrophe and single and double quotation marks, the uses of the prime symbol are quite different. While an apostrophe is now often used in place of the prime, and a double quote in place of the double prime (due to the lack of prime symbols on everyday writing keyboards), such substitutions are not considered appropriate in formal materials or in typesetting.

Designation of units
The prime symbol  is commonly used to represent feet (ft), and the double prime  is used to represent inches (in).

Primes are also used for angles. The prime symbol  is used for arcminutes ( of a degree), and the double prime  for arcseconds ( of an arcminute). As an angular measurement,  means 3 degrees, 5 arcminutes and 30 arcseconds. In historical astronomical works, the triple prime was used to denote "thirds" ( of an arcsecond) and a quadruple prime  "fourths" ( of a third of arc), but modern usage has replaced this with decimal fractions of an arcsecond.

Primes are sometimes used to indicate minutes, and double primes to indicate seconds of time, as in the John Cage composition 4′33″ (spoken as "four thirty-three"), a composition that lasts exactly 4 minutes 33 seconds. This notation only applies to duration, and is seldom used for durations longer than 60 minutes.

Use in mathematics, statistics, and science
In mathematics, the prime is generally used to generate more variable names for similar things without resorting to subscripts, with  generally meaning something related to (or derived from) .

Other notation for derivatives also exists (see Notation for differentiation).
 Set complement:  is the complement of the set  (other notation also exists).
 The negation of an event in probability theory:  (other notation also exists).
 The result of a transformation: 
 The transpose of a matrix (other notation also exists)
The dual of a vector space
The prime is said to "decorate" the letter to which it applies. The same convention is adopted in functional programming, particularly in Haskell.

In geometry, geography and astronomy, prime and double prime are used as abbreviations for minute and second of arc (and thus latitude, longitude, elevation and right ascension).

In physics, the prime is used to denote variables after an event. For example,  would indicate the velocity of object A after an event.

In physical chemistry, it is used to distinguish between the lower state and the upper state of a quantum number during a transition. For example,  denotes the upper state of the quantum number  while  denotes the lower state of the quantum number .

In molecular biology, the prime is used to denote the positions of carbon on a ring of deoxyribose or ribose. The prime distinguishes places on these two chemicals, rather than places on other parts of DNA or RNA, like phosphate groups or nucleic acids. Thus, when indicating the direction of movement of an enzyme along a string of DNA, biologists will say that it moves from the  end to the  end, because these carbons are on the ends of the DNA molecule. The chemistry of this reaction demands that the  be extended by DNA synthesis. Prime can also be used to indicate which position a molecule has attached to, such as

Use in linguistics
The prime can be used in the transliteration of some languages, such as Slavic languages, to denote palatalization. Prime and double prime are used to transliterate Cyrillic yeri (the soft sign, ь) and yer (the hard sign, ъ). However, in ISO 9, the corresponding modifier letters are used instead.

Originally, X-bar theory used a bar over syntactic units to indicate bar-levels in syntactic structure, generally rendered as an overbar. While easy to write, the bar notation proved difficult to typeset, leading to the adoption of the prime symbol to indicate a bar. (Despite the lack of bar, the unit would still be read as "X bar", as opposed to "X prime".) With contemporary development of typesetting software such as LaTeX, typesetting bars is considerably simpler; nevertheless, both prime and bar markups are accepted usages.

Some X-bar notations use a double-prime (standing in for a double-bar) to indicate a phrasal level, indicated in most notations by "XP".

Use in music

The prime symbol is used in combination with lower case letters in the Helmholtz pitch notation system to distinguish notes in different octaves from middle C upwards.

In some musical scores, the double prime  is used to indicate a length of time in seconds. It is used over a fermata  denoting a long note or rest.

Computer encodings 
Unicode and HTML representations of the prime and related symbols are as follows.

  (lower case p)
  (upper case P)
 
 
 
 
 
 
 

The "modifier letter prime" and "modifier letter double prime" characters are intended for linguistic purposes, such as the indication of stress or the transliteration of certain Cyrillic characters.

In a context when the character set used does not include the prime or double prime character (e.g., in an online discussion context where only ASCII or ISO 8859-1 [ISO Latin 1] is expected), they are often respectively approximated by ASCII apostrophe (U+0027) or quotation mark (U+0022).

See also 

 
 
 Rubik's Cube move notation, where the prime is used to invert moves or move sequences.

Notes

References

External links 
 Unicode General Punctuation code chart
 Unicode Spacing Modifier Letters code chart

 

Mathematical symbols
Typographical symbols